Angers IceParc is an ice rink located in Angers, Maine-et-Loire, France. It consists of a main arena featuring a 60 × 30 metre rink, and a second hall offering a training rink of the same dimensions. It is the home venue for professional ice hockey team Ducs d'Angers.
The building was designed by Chabanne et Partenaires, sports venue specialists who previously worked on several other French ice rinks.

References

Indoor arenas in France
Sports venues in Maine-et-Loire
Buildings and structures in Angers